Podgrad na Pohorju is a small settlement in the Pohorje Hills in the Municipality of Slovenska Bistrica in northeastern Slovenia. The area is part of the traditional region of Styria. It is now included with the rest of the municipality in the Drava Statistical Region.

The settlement name Podgrad in Slovene means 'under the castle'. The ruins of a 12th-century castle known as Zajčji grad can still be seen on a hill east of the settlement.

References

External links
Podgrad na Pohorju at Geopedia

Populated places in the Municipality of Slovenska Bistrica